Charles Gregory (5 June 1847 – 5 April 1935) was an Australian cricketer. He played two first-class matches for New South Wales between 1870/71 and 1871/72.

See also
 List of New South Wales representative cricketers

References

External links
 

1847 births
1935 deaths
Australian cricketers
New South Wales cricketers
Cricketers from Wollongong